Sturgeon's law (or Sturgeon's revelation) is an adage stating "ninety percent of everything is crap".  It was coined by Theodore Sturgeon, an American science fiction author and critic, and was inspired by his observation that, while science fiction was often derided for its low quality by critics, most work in other fields was low-quality too, and so science fiction was thus no different.

The original Sturgeon's law 

Sturgeon deemed Sturgeon's law to mean "nothing is always absolutely so" in the story "The Claustrophile" in a 1956 issue of Galaxy. The second adage, variously rendered as "ninety percent of everything is crud" or "ninety percent of everything is crap", was known as "Sturgeon's Revelation", formulated as such in his book review column for Venture in 1957. However, almost all modern uses of the term Sturgeon's law refer to the second, including the definition listed in the Oxford English Dictionary.

Discussion 
A similar adage appears in Rudyard Kipling's The Light That Failed, published in 1890. 

A 1946 essay Confessions of a Book Reviewer by George Orwell asserts about books:

According to science fiction author William Tenn, Sturgeon first expressed his law circa 1951, at a talk at New York University attended by Tenn. The statement was subsequently included in a talk Sturgeon gave at a 1953 Labor Day weekend session of the World Science Fiction Convention in Philadelphia.

The first written reference to the adage is in the September 1957 issue of Venture:

The adage appears again in the March 1958 issue of Venture, where Sturgeon wrote:

In 2013, philosopher Daniel Dennett championed Sturgeon's law as one of his seven tools for critical thinking.

Its re-introduction to a modern audience received a positive reception, according to Dennett.

See also 
 List of eponymous laws
 Not even wrong
 Pareto distribution
 Pareto principle
 Rockism

References

External links

 Theodore Sturgeon's 1972 interview with David G. Hartwell, The New York Review of Science Fiction #7 March 1989; #8 April 1989

Adages
Art criticism
Galaxy Science Fiction
1950s neologisms